The Minister of Culture (Faroese: landsstýrismaðurin í mentamálum or mentamálaráðharrin) is a member of the government of the Faroe Islands and head of the Ministry of Education, Research and Culture (Faroese: Mentamálaráðið). The ministry changed its name in 2002 from Ministry of Education and Culture and before 1998 cultural affairs did not have its own ministry but were together with other affairs a part of a ministry. The current Ministry of Culture is responsible for education, science, church, media, sports and other leisure activities.

Notes and references 

Faroe Islands
Culture